Renato Patricio González De La Hoz (born 19 February 1990) is a Chilean footballer that currently plays for Deportes Valdivia of the Segunda División Profesional de Chile.

Career statistics

International goals

Honours

Club
San Marcos de Arica
 Primera B: 2012

References

External links
 

1990 births
Living people
Footballers from Santiago
Chilean footballers
Chilean expatriate footballers
Chile international footballers
Club Deportivo Palestino footballers
Associação Atlética Ponte Preta players
Universidad de Concepción footballers
Cobresal footballers
San Marcos de Arica footballers
Universidad de Chile footballers
C.D. Antofagasta footballers
Santiago Morning footballers
Puerto Montt footballers
Deportes Recoleta footballers
Deportes Valdivia footballers
Chilean Primera División players
Campeonato Brasileiro Série B players
Primera B de Chile players
Segunda División Profesional de Chile players
Chilean expatriate sportspeople in Brazil
Expatriate footballers in Brazil
Association football midfielders